William Henry Hunt (June 12, 1823 – February 27, 1884) was the 29th United States Secretary of the Navy, Minister to the Russian Empire and a judge of the Court of Claims.

Early life
Hunt was born on June 12, 1823, in Charleston, South Carolina, He was the youngest of five sons born to Louisa (née Gaillard) Hunt (1786–1850), sister of U.S. Senator John Gaillard, and Thomas Hunt (1780–1830), who had been born in Nassau, Bahamas where his grandfather Robert Hunt held the position of Governor-General of the Bahamas for many years. His father was a member of the Louisiana State Legislature, a prominent lawyer, and a successful planter. Among his siblings was Theodore Gaillard Hunt, a U.S. Representative from Louisiana, Randell Hunt, a Louisiana State Senator, Dr. Thomas Hunt Jr., a founder of the Medical College of Louisiana and president of the University of Louisiana (now Tulane University).

He attended Yale University and Yale Law School, then read law with Theodore Hunt and Randell Hunt in New Orleans, Louisiana.

Career
He entered private practice in New Orleans from 1844 to 1878. He served as a colonel in the Confederate States Army in 1862. He was an acting professor of civil law for the University of Louisiana (now Tulane University) in 1866. He was Attorney General of Louisiana from 1876 to 1877.

Federal judicial service

Hunt was nominated by President Rutherford B. Hayes on April 18, 1878, to a seat on the Court of Claims (later the United States Court of Claims) vacated by Judge Ebenezer Peck. He was confirmed by the United States Senate on May 15, 1878, and received his commission the same day. His service terminated on March 11, 1881, due to his resignation.

Secretary of the Navy

Hunt served as United States Secretary of the Navy from 1881 to 1882, in the cabinets of President James A. Garfield and President Chester A. Arthur.

Minister to Russia

Hunt served as Envoy Extraordinary and Minister Plenipotentiary to the Russian Empire for the United States Department of State from 1882 to 1884.

Personal life
Hunt was married to Elizabeth Ridgely Hunt (d. 1864), daughter of Commandant Charles Goodwin Ridgely and the former Cornelia Louisiana Livingston (a granddaughter of Walter Livingston and Chancellor Robert R. Livingston). Together, Elizabeth and William were the parents of seven children, six sons and one daughter, including:

 Ridgely Hunt (1854–1916), a Lt. in the U.S. Navy.
 Thomas Hunt (1855–1933), who married Helen Jewett, a daughter of U.S. Representative Hugh Judge Jewett, in 1888.
 Randell Hunt (1856–1898)
 William Henry Hunt Jr. (1857–1949), the Attorney General of Montana, Governor of Puerto Rico and Federal judge.
 Livingston Hunt (1859–1943), a Rear Admiral in the U.S. Navy who married Catharine Howland Hunt (1868–1963), a daughter of architect Richard Morris Hunt.
 Cornelia Ridgely Hunt (1861–1930), who married Dr. William Kelly Newton (1850–1909) in 1905.
 Gaillard Hunt (1862–1924), a historian who married Mary Goodfellow.

After the death of his first wife in 1864, he remarried to Sarah Harrison Barker (1819–1908), a daughter of New York merchant John T. Adams, in 1866.

He died on February 27, 1884, in Saint Petersburg, Russian Empire. His body was returned to the United States and after a funeral at St. John's Church in Washington, D.C. He was buried at Oak Hill Cemetery in Washington.

Legacy and honors

Two ships in the United States Navy have been named USS Hunt for Hunt.

References

External links
 
 

1823 births
1884 deaths
Louisiana Attorneys General
Confederate States Army officers
United States Secretaries of the Navy
Ambassadors of the United States to Russia
Judges of the United States Court of Claims
Garfield administration cabinet members
Arthur administration cabinet members
United States Article I federal judges appointed by Rutherford B. Hayes
19th-century American judges
19th-century American diplomats
19th-century American politicians
Ridgely family
Burials at Oak Hill Cemetery (Washington, D.C.)